The Rutherford model was devised by the New Zealand-born physicist Ernest Rutherford to describe an atom. Rutherford directed the Geiger–Marsden experiment in 1909, which suggested, upon Rutherford's 1911 analysis, that J. J. Thomson's plum pudding model of the atom was incorrect. Rutherford's new model for the atom, based on the experimental results, contained new features of a relatively high central charge concentrated into a very small volume in comparison to the rest of the atom and with this central volume containing most of the atom's mass. This region would be known as the atomic nucleus.

Experimental basis for the model 
Rutherford overturned Thomson's model in 1911 with his well-known gold foil experiment in which he demonstrated that the atom has a tiny and heavy nucleus. Rutherford designed an experiment to use the alpha particles emitted by a radioactive element as probes to the unseen world of atomic structure. If Thomson was correct, the beam would go straight through the gold foil. Most of the beams went through the foil, but a few were deflected.

Rutherford presented his own physical model for subatomic structure, as an interpretation for the unexpected experimental results. In it, the atom is made up of a central charge (this is the modern atomic nucleus, though Rutherford did not use the term "nucleus" in his paper) surrounded by a cloud of (presumably) orbiting electrons. In this May 1911 paper, Rutherford only committed himself to a small central region of very high positive or negative charge in the atom.

For concreteness, consider the passage of a high speed α particle through an atom having a positive central charge N e, and surrounded by a compensating charge of N electrons.

From purely energetic considerations of how far particles of known speed would be able to penetrate toward a central charge of 100 e, Rutherford was able to calculate that the radius of his gold central charge would need to be less (how much less could not be told) than 3.4 × 10−14 metres. This was in a gold atom known to be 10−10 metres or so in radius—a very surprising finding, as it implied a strong central charge less than 1/3000th of the diameter of the atom.

The Rutherford model served to concentrate a great deal of the atom's charge and mass to a very small core, but didn't attribute any structure to the remaining electrons and remaining atomic mass. It did mention the atomic model of Hantaro Nagaoka, in which the electrons are arranged in one or more rings, with the specific metaphorical structure of the stable rings of Saturn. The plum pudding model of J. J. Thomson also had rings of orbiting electrons. Jean Baptiste Perrin claimed in his Nobel lecture that he was the first one to suggest the model in his paper dated 1901. But in actuality the Northern Irish physicist, Joseph Larmor, created the first solar system model of the atom in 1897. 

The Rutherford paper suggested that the central charge of an atom might be "proportional" to its atomic mass in hydrogen mass units u (roughly 1/2 of it, in Rutherford's model). For gold, this mass number is 197 (not then known to great accuracy) and was therefore modelled by Rutherford to be possibly 196 u. However, Rutherford did not attempt to make the direct connection of central charge to atomic number, since gold's "atomic number" (at that time merely its place number in the periodic table) was 79, and Rutherford had modelled the charge to be about +100 units (he had actually suggested 98 units of positive charge, to make half of 196). Thus, Rutherford did not formally suggest the two numbers (periodic table place, 79, and nuclear charge, 98 or 100) might be exactly the same.

A month after Rutherford's paper appeared, the proposal regarding the exact identity of atomic number and nuclear charge was made by Antonius van den Broek, and later confirmed experimentally within two years, by Henry Moseley.

These are the key indicators:
 The atom's electron cloud does not influence alpha particle scattering.
 Much of an atom's positive charge is concentrated in a relatively tiny volume at the center of the atom, known today as the nucleus. The magnitude of this charge is proportional to (up to a charge number that can be approximately half of) the atom's atomic mass—the remaining mass is now known to be mostly attributed to neutrons. This concentrated central mass and charge is responsible for deflecting both alpha and beta particles.
 The mass of heavy atoms such as gold is mostly concentrated in the central charge region, since calculations show it is not deflected or moved by the high speed alpha particles, which have very high momentum in comparison to electrons, but not with regard to a heavy atom as a whole.
 The atom itself is about 100,000 (105) times the diameter of the nucleus. This could be related to putting a grain of sand in the middle of a football field.

Contribution to modern science 

After Rutherford's discovery, scientists started to realise that the atom is not ultimately a single particle, but is made up of far smaller subatomic particles. Subsequent research determined the exact atomic structure which led to Rutherford's gold foil experiment. Scientists eventually discovered that atoms have a positively charged nucleus (with an exact atomic number of charges) in the center, with a radius of about 1.2 × 10−15 meters × [atomic mass number]. Electrons were found to be even smaller.

Later, scientists found the expected number of electrons (the same as the atomic number) in an atom by using X-rays. When an X-ray passes through an atom, some of it is scattered, while the rest passes through the atom. Since the X-ray loses its intensity primarily due to scattering at electrons, by noting the rate of decrease in X-ray intensity, the number of electrons contained in an atom can be accurately estimated.

Symbolism 

Rutherford's model deferred to the idea of many electrons in rings, per Nagaoka. However, once Niels Bohr modified this view into a picture of just a few planet-like electrons for light atoms, the Rutherford–Bohr model caught the imagination of the public. It has since continually been used as a symbol for atoms and even for "atomic" energy (even though this is more properly considered nuclear energy). Examples of its use over the past century include but are not limited to:
 The logo of the United States Atomic Energy Commission, which was in part responsible for its later usage in relation to nuclear fission technology in particular.
 The flag of the International Atomic Energy Agency is a Rutherford atom, enclosed in olive branches.
 The US minor league baseball Albuquerque Isotopes' logo is a Rutherford atom, with the electron orbits forming an A.
 A similar symbol, the atomic whirl, was chosen as the symbol for the American Atheists, and has come to be used as a symbol of atheism in general.
 The Unicode Miscellaneous Symbols code point U+269B (⚛) uses a Rutherford atom.
 The television show The Big Bang Theory uses a Rutherford atom as its logo.
 The JavaScript library React uses the Rutherford atom as its logo.
 On maps, it is generally used to indicate a nuclear power installation.

References

External links 
 Rutherford's Model by Raymond College
 Rutherford's Model by Kyushu University

1911 in science
Articles containing video clips
Ernest Rutherford
Foundational quantum physics
Obsolete theories in physics